In the USDA soil taxonomy, Anthrepts is a term for soil with evidence of human habitation and farming.

See also

Anthrosols in the World Soil Classification.
Inceptisols of which anthrepts are a suborder of.

References

Types of soil